The 2018 Sacramento Republic FC season is the club's fifth season of existence. The club is playing in the United Soccer League, the second tier of the American soccer pyramid. Sacramento Republic FC is competing in the Western Conference of the USL.

Background

Club

Roster
As of April 9, 2018.

Staff
As of February 1, 2018.

Competitions

Preseason

USL

Results summary

Standings

Matches 

Kickoff times are in PDT (UTC-07) unless shown otherwise

Postseason

U.S. Open Cup

Friendlies

Transfers

In

Out

Loan in

References

Sacramento Republic
Sacramento
Sacramento Republic
Sacramento Republic FC seasons